Callicarpa dichotoma, the purple beautyberry or early amethyst, is a species of beautyberry. They are cultivated as garden shrubs. The flowers are pink to white. The berries which are small drupes are purple. The fruits grow closely together in large clusters. The fruit provides food for wild life. The berries are edible and have a mild taste. This species can be found in China, Vietnam, Korea and Japan.

External links
 Callicarpa dichotoma info
 Callicarpa dichotoma information

dichotoma
Flora of China
Flora of Eastern Asia
Flora of Vietnam
Plants described in 1790